The following is a list of Malayalam films released in the year 1975.

Dubbed films

References

 1975
1975
Lists of 1975 films by country or language